Blues for Greeny is the tenth solo studio by Irish guitarist and singer Gary Moore, released in 1995. It is a tribute to Peter Green, guitarist and founder member of the band Fleetwood Mac. The album was recorded using the same 1959 Les Paul Standard used to record the original tracks. Green  loaned and then sold the guitar to Moore after leaving Fleetwood Mac.

Track listing

Bonus tracks on the 2003 digitally remastered edition. These Bonus tracks were released as CD-single tracks on Need Your Love So Bad CD-Single VSCDG 1456.

Personnel
Gary Moore – guitar, vocals
Tommy Eyre – keyboards
Nick Payn – baritone saxophone
Nick Pentelow – tenor saxophone
Andy Pyle – bass
Graham Walker – drums

Charts

References

Gary Moore albums
1995 albums
Charisma Records albums
Covers albums
Fleetwood Mac